Vladimir Skrbinsek (1902–1987) was a Slovenian stage and film actor.

Filmography

References

Bibliography 
 Daniel J. Goulding. Liberated Cinema: The Yugoslav Experience, 1945-2001. Indiana University Press, 2002.

External links 
 

1902 births
1987 deaths
Actors from Ljubljana
Slovenian male film actors
Slovenian male stage actors